Bailey's shrew (Crocidura baileyi) is a species of mammal in the family Soricidae. The name honours American naturalist and museum director Alfred Marshall Bailey. It is endemic to Ethiopia. Its natural habitat is subtropical or tropical high-elevation grassland.

References

Bailey's shrew
Mammals of Ethiopia
Endemic fauna of Ethiopia
Bailey's shrew
Taxonomy articles created by Polbot